Football Club International Turku, commonly referred to as Inter Turku and colloquially known as Inter, is a professional football club based in Turku, Finland, that competes in the Veikkausliiga, the top flight of Finnish Football. Founded in 1990 by Stefan Håkans, the club has a rivalry with Turun Palloseura.

Inter have won one League title, two Finnish Cups, and one League Cup. They play their home league matches at Veritas Stadion, with a capacity of 9,372 seats for most matches.

History
FC Inter was founded in 1990 by Stefan Håkans, the managing director of the towage and salvage company Alfons Håkans, allegedly after his 11-year-old son could not fit into any of the other youth teams in Turku. The club started out as a youth team, but in 1992 a senior squad was founded and it entered the Finnish league system at the fourth level (Third Division). The following year, the club assumed the place of the financially troubled local club Turun Toverit in the Second Division. Manager Timo Sinkkonen invested in new players, and eventually the club finished first and was promoted to the First Division (Ykkönen).

In 1995, Inter finished first in the Ykkönen and was promoted, as well as reaching the semi-final stage in the Finnish Cup. The squad was strengthened with new players, and in 1996, as both of Turku's better teams were now playing in the Veikkausliiga, the club's attendance records were broken with 8,200 spectators in the local derby between TPS and Inter.

In 1997, the club were relegated after finishing last in the Veikkausliiga, but achieved promotion again the following season. New foreign players were bought to strengthen the squad, such as Richard Teberio and Fernando della Sala. Since then the club has consistently finished between 7th and 4th in the league, and maintained a steady inflow of foreign players as well as young starlets from its own youth academy.

During the 2006 season Inter sacked their manager Kari Virtanen and hired new coach, Dutchman Rene van Eck. After the season van Eck returned to Switzerland to coach FC Wohlen, and another Dutchman Job Dragtsma took over.

In 2008 Inter led the league since early season and clinched their first Finnish championship title after winning against FF Jaro in their final game.

European cup history

Season to season

Current squad

Out on loan

Management
As of 19 January 2021.

Honours
Veikkausliiga
Winners: 2008
Runners-up: 2019

 Finnish Cup
Winners: 2009, 2017–18
Runners-up: 2020, 2022

Finnish League Cup
Winners: 2008

Player records
Most goals scored: Tero Forss (74 goals)
Most matches played: Petri Lehtonen (227 matches)

Past managers
 Anders Romberg (1992)
 Timo Sinkkonen (1993 – 1994)
 Hannu Paatelo (1995 – 1997)
 Tomi Jalo (1997 – 1998)
 Steven Polack (1998)
 Timo Askolin (1999 – 2000)
 Pertti Lundell (January 1, 2001 – December 31, 2002)
 Kari Virtanen (January 1, 2003 – September 16, 2006)
 René van Eck (September 16, 2006 – November 16, 2006)
 Job Dragtsma (January 1, 2007 – May 26, 2016)
 Jami Wallenius (May 26, 2016 – August 3, 2016)
 Shefki Kuqi (August 3, 2016 – August 3, 2017)
 Fabrizio Piccareta (August 3, 2017 – June 10, 2018)
 Jose Riveiro (January 1, 2019 – December 31, 2021)
 Miguel Grau (January 1 2022 – September 19, 2022)
 Ramiro Muñoz (September 20, 2022 – December 31, 2022)

References

External links
 FCInter.fi – The club's official site.
 Ultraboyz – A supporters' club in Finnish.

 
International Turku
Sport in Turku
Association football clubs established in 1990
1990 establishments in Finland